John Bull Rubber Co. Ltd. was a British tyre manufacturer based in Leicester. It was established 1906 and was originally named Leicester Rubber Company, and was renamed John Bull Rubber in 1934 after its popular product of the same name.

History
The Leicester Rubber Company was set up in 1906 by two brothers John Cecil Burton and Hubert Henry Burton importing and selling bicycle tyres.

In 1915 a new factory was built in Evington Valley Road where the company started manufacturing its own cycle and pram tyres.

In 1937 the company formed a further company called Metalastic to specialise in rubber to metal components. The two companies merged in 1955.

In 1958, the company was acquired by Dunlop Rubber.

References

1906 establishments in England
British companies established in 1906
Tyre manufacturers of England
Companies based in Leicestershire